Tana Nile is a fictional character appearing in American comic books published by Marvel Comics.

Publication history

Tana Nile first appeared in Thor #129 and was created by Stan Lee and Jack Kirby.

Fictional character biography
Tana Nile, of the planet Rigel-3, was a leading female member of the Colonizers of Rigel. In her attempt to colonize the planet Earth, Tana Nile took a human form as Jane Foster's roommate. Tana took control of Jane Foster's will, and then resumed her Rigellian form. She attempted to take control of the Earth, but was ordered to cease her attempt to colonize Earth. She left Earth to be given a new assignment, and was told that the High Commissioner of Rigel had chosen her to be his wife. Some time later, she encountered Thor during his second journey into the Black Galaxy. 

Tana Nile later encountered Sif, Hildegarde, and sailor Silas Grant on the Blackworld planet while she fought Ego-Prime. She revealed that Ego-Prime was a slab that she had removed from Ego the Living Planet and had taken to Blackworld in order to transform it into a habitable world, but that Ego-Prime had proved to be uncontrollable. Blackworld was destroyed in a nuclear war, and Tana and her allies fled to Earth, pursued by Ego-Prime. There, she was aided by Silas Grant in clashes with Ego-Prime's monsters. Tana assumed a human form in order to live on Earth. Tana then became an ally to Thor and the Asgardians. She aided Thor in battling trolls. She first visited Asgard. She was captured by Sssthgar, but was freed by Thor, and she released Odin, Hogun, and Fandral from captivity. She accompanied Thor to the Dark Nebula to help rescue Sif and Karnilla. She accompanied Thor back to Rigel-3, just in time to witness the destruction of Rigel-3 by the Rhunians. She was then reunited with the Grand Commissioner. She accompanied Thor to the planet Rhun. She then bade farewell to Thor, while Silas Grant announces that he will stay with his "good friend" Tana.

Tana visited Charles Xavier's Massachusetts Academy to learn more about human beings.  During an adventure in an alternate dimension created by Franklin Richards, she fell in love with Howard the Duck. After a spontaneous kiss, Howard tells her of his attachment to Beverly Switzler, and she accepts that romance with him is inappropriate.

During the Annihilation storyline, Tana Nile frames Ronan the Accuser for the House of Fiyero in exchange for information on Ronan. He promises to hunt her down, along with others involved in the trial, to discover the true reason behind his dismissal. Tana Nile later joined Gamora's Graces, a collection of super-powered women from across the galaxy. The Graces, along with much of known space, comes under threat by Annihilus' Annihilation Wave. Tana does not survive.

Powers and abilities
Thanks to the alien attributes of the Rigellian race, Tana Nile has the ability to increase her own density at will, increasing her strength and resistance to physical injury to superhuman levels. She has the psionic ability to control the mind of another humanoid or to override another humanoid's control of his or her voluntary muscles (through "mind thrust").

Tana Nile wears body armor of unknown composition, which includes devices enabling her to rearrange the molecular structure of her body and clothing in order to disguise herself as an Earthwoman. She was armed with a "stasis gun" that can project concussive energy or intense heat. She also uses a solar beam communicator device, worn on her wrist, permitting instantaneous communication between Earth and Rigel via hyperspace transmission.

In other media

Television
 Tana Nile appeared in The Super Hero Squad Show episode "Tremble at the Might of...MODOK."
 Tana Nile appears in the Ultimate Spider-Man episode "Guardians of the Galaxy", voiced by Grey DeLisle. She is seen in a video game that Peter Parker and Sam Alexander are playing.
 Tana Nile appears in the Guardians of the Galaxy episode "Girls Just Wanna Have Fun," voiced by Jessica DiCicco. This version is the daughter of the Grand Commissioner of Rigel. After Tana Nile fled from Rigel-3 to continue her party lifestyle on Conjunction as a way to avoid the Rigellians' coming of age ritual called the Centering, the Grand Commissioner hired the Guardians of the Galaxy to bring her back to Rigel-3. After some difficulty and a special strategy from Drax the Destroyer, the Guardians of the Galaxy were able to apprehend Tana Nile. While on their way back to Rigel-3 with Tana Nile, the Guardians of the Galaxy are warned by the Grand Commissioner that Tana Nile can throw tantrums most of the time and not to let her fall into the hands of a rebel Rigellian group called the Empathetics. As Tana Nile reminds him of his deceased daughter, Drax tries to keep her in a good mood. Eventually, the strain of being their prisoner causes Tana Nile to break Drax's stuffed toy Mr. Rhinopus and flee from the ship in a pod. Drax and Gamora track her to Scrapyard Drofnas where the Empathetics are. When the Empathetics start to harm Drax the Destroyer and Gamora, Star-Lord, Rocket Raccoon, and Groot arrive upon calling the Rigellian army. It was revealed during this time by Tana Nile and the Grand Commissioner that the Centering involves stripping the Rigellian of their emotions to get better control of their telepathy. When Tana Nile was caught in the tractor beam of the Grand Commissioner's ship with Drax also in toll, she accepts her fate as she passes this part of the Centering. Eventually, Tana Nile decides to follow in her father's footsteps where she plans to lead the Rigellians into an era of compassion and better understanding. In addition, she mails Drax a package containing his repaired Mr. Rhinopus. In the episode "Me and You and a Dog Named Cosmo," Tana Nile holds a Rigellian Peace Conference on Knowhere between the Grand Commissioner of Rigel and the Empathetics led by Jukka where Gamora and Drax the Destroyer help with the security detail. During the Universal Believers' attack on Knowhere, Tana Nile persuades her father and Jukka to use their telepathy to throw Drax the Destroyer towards the Universal Believers' flagship.

References

External links
 Tana Nile at Marvel.com
 Tana Nile at Comic Book Database

Characters created by Jack Kirby
Characters created by Stan Lee
Marvel Comics aliens